A modal share (also called mode split, mode-share, or modal split) is the percentage of travelers using a particular type of transportation or number of trips using said type. In freight transportation, this may be measured in mass.

Modal share is an important component in developing sustainable transport within a city or region. In recent years, many cities have set modal share targets for balanced and sustainable transport modes, particularly 30% of  non-motorized (cycling and walking) and 30% of public transport. These goals reflect a desire for a modal shift, or a change between modes, and usually encompasses an increase in the proportion of trips made using sustainable modes.

Comparability of data
Modal share data is usually obtained by travel surveys, which are often conducted by local governments, using different methodologies. Sampling and interviewing techniques, definitions, the extent of geographical areas and other methodological differences can influence comparability. Most typical surveys refer to the main mode of transport used during trips to work. Surveys covering entire metropolitan areas are preferred over city proper surveys which typically cover only the denser inner city.

Modal split of journeys to work
The following tables present the modal split of journeys to work. Note that it is better to use a measure of all trips on a typical weekday, but journey to work data is more readily available. It would also be beneficial to disaggregate private motor vehicles figures to car driver, car passengers and motorbikes (especially relevant for Asian cities).

Metropolitan areas with over 1,000,000 inhabitants

Metropolitan areas with over 250,000 inhabitants

Notes: European data is based on the Urban Audit

Modal share targets
The Charter of Brussels, signed by 36 cities including Brussels, Ghent, Milan, Munich, Seville, Edinburgh, Toulouse, Bordeaux, Gdansk, and Timișoara, commits the signatories to achieve at least 15% of bicycling modal share by 2020, and calls upon European institutions to do likewise. The cycling modal share is strongly associated with the size of local cycling infrastructure

The Canadian city of Hamilton adopted a similar modal share target plan in 2005.

Modal share in the developing world
The modal share differs considerably depending on each city in the developing world.

According to UNECE, the global on-road vehicle fleet is to double by 2050 (from 1,2 billion to 2,5 billion, see introduction), with most future car purchases taking place in developing countries. Some experts even mention that the number of vehicles in developing countries will increase by 4 or 5-fold by 2050 (compared to current car use levels), and that the majority of these will be second-hand.

Legislation impacting the modal share
Through legislation (i.e. taxing and conditions on new car purchases), ... car ownership can be discouraged. This could help in achieving a modal shift.

See also
Car ownership
Circulation plan
Phase-out of fossil fuel vehicles
Intermodal passenger transport
Mobility transition
Mode choice (the decisions that determine Modal share, especially in traffic analysis and forecasting)
Mode of transport
Rail usage statistics by country
Road reallocation
Environmental aspects of the electric car
Smart mobility

Notes

External links
 Epomm – Modal share data for more than 300 Cities with more or less than 100,000 inhabitants, mostly in Europe
  – Modal share data and trends over the past 20 years for Australian cities (unpublished paper by David Ashley)

References 

Low-carbon economy
Transportation planning
Transport systems
Transport by mode